Israel López may refer to:
 Israel "Cachao" López, Cuban mambo musician, bassist and composer
 Israel López (footballer), Mexican football player